The Canadian Flag Collection is the special exhibit of Settlers, Rails & Trails Inc, the museum located in Argyle, Manitoba, Canada. It is the 2nd largest museum flag collection in Canada, second only to the Canadian Museum of History in Gatineau, Quebec, Canada.
As of January 2019, the collection cares for over 1,400 flags in its permanent holdings.

The CFC contains several categories:

 Historic Canada 
 Corporate Canada
 Regional Canada (Cities, towns, municipalities, counties)
 Sports & Organizations (teams, events, games)
 Special Event Flags (anniversaries, milestones)

Reputation 

Over the past 20 years, the museum has gained the reputation for being "Canada's Flag Depository". Companies, Universities, Towns/Cities, organizations and even private collectors and individuals submit their flags to the museum for preservation, research, exhibition and public relations purposes.

The museum uses its flags to represent an important component of Canadian popular culture. Off-site exhibits include National Flag of Canada Day, Manitoba Day, Remembrance Day Services and Canada Day activities.

In February 2015 SR&T displayed its extensive flag collection at the Manitoba Legislative Building Rotunda for the 50th Anniversary of the National Flag of Canada. These flags will once again be on display in the Legislature in July 2017 to mark Canada's Sesquicentennial.

In May 2016, SR&T once again displayed 25 flags historic flags in the Manitoba Legislature to correspond with the provincial flag's 50th anniversary.

The museum's flag brochure is a statement of what donors and contributors can expect from the exhibit. It also lists past donors to the CFC since its first inception in 1997.

In 2015, seventeen Canadian Embassies, from across the world, sent National Flags of Canada to Settlers, Rails & Trails to become a permanent part of the Canadian Flag Collection. These flags flew at their respective embassies for approximately 6 months before traveling to Argyle, Manitoba.

References

 http://www.pro.rcip-chin.gc.ca/GetMember.do?lang=en&id=guaevb&ens=cnRsTGFuZz1lbg== (Canadian Heritage Information Network - SR&T )
 http://www.winnipegfreepress.com/arts-and-life/life/a-banner-day-97216854.html?story=A%20banner%20day (Winnipeg Free Press Article on the CFC)
 http://www.winnipegfreepress.com/arts-and-life/life/chairmen-emof-the-em-hoard-112467294.html (Winnipeg Free Press Follow up article on the CFC)

External links
 

Exhibitions in Canada